Devin Wayne Lemons (born March 20, 1979) is a former American football linebacker in the National Football League for the Washington Redskins.  He was born in Bryan, Texas, and played college football at Texas Tech University.

Lemons now coaches football at Prosper High School in Prosper, Texas.

References

1979 births
Living people
People from Bryan, Texas
American football linebackers
Washington Redskins players
Texas Tech Red Raiders football players